The canton of Les Forêts de Gascogne is an administrative division of the Lot-et-Garonne department, southwestern France. It was created at the French canton reorganisation which came into effect in March 2015. Its seat is in Casteljaloux.

It consists of the following communes:
 
Allons
Antagnac
Anzex
Argenton
Beauziac
Bouglon
Boussès
Calonges
Casteljaloux
Caubeyres
Durance
Fargues-sur-Ourbise
Grézet-Cavagnan
Guérin
Houeillès
Labastide-Castel-Amouroux
Lagruère
Leyritz-Moncassin
Le Mas-d'Agenais
Pindères
Pompogne
Poussignac
La Réunion
Romestaing
Ruffiac
Sainte-Gemme-Martaillac
Sainte-Marthe
Saint-Martin-Curton
Sauméjan
Sénestis
Villefranche-du-Queyran
Villeton

References

Cantons of Lot-et-Garonne